Hopa District is a district of Artvin Province of Turkey. Its seat is the town Hopa. Its area is 130 km2, and its population is 28,136 (2021). In 2017, the Kemalpaşa District was created from part of Hopa District.

Composition
There is one municipality in Hopa District:
 Hopa

There are 16 villages in Hopa District:

 Balıkköy
 Başköy
 Başoba
 Çamlı
 Çavuşlu
 Çimenli
 Esenkıyı
 Eşmekaya
 Güneşli
 Güvercinli
 Hendek
 Koyuncular
 Pınarlı
 Subaşı
 Yeşilköy
 Yoldere

References

Districts of Artvin Province